Siempre Tuya is a 1952 Mexican film starring singer Jorge Negrete.  It is filmed in black and white, in Spanish, and features Negrete singing some popular ranchera-music standards.

Plot
The film follows the trials of tenant farmer Ramón García (Negrete) and his wife Soledad (Gloria Marín) when drought forces them off their land in the Mexican state of Zacatecas.  They make their way to Mexico City, where they find city life difficult.  Ramón cannot find steady work.  They build a home in a squatters' settlement, but then their house is bulldozed by a developer.  Soledad finds work as a live-in maid, and her husband can see her for only a few moments each evening.

Ramón, destitute and despondent, wanders into a theater during a live radio broadcast of an audience-participation talent show.  Ramón volunteers for the show, and although the host makes fun of him as a hayseed, he wows the audience with a stirring version of the classic Mexico Lindo (Beautiful Mexico).  The audience reaction causes the station manager to hire García as a featured performer, as a change of pace from more trendy musical genres.  García gains a wide radio following by singing traditional songs praising the virtues of Mexico.  Now highly paid and famous, García rents a luxurious apartment, but his wife Soledad fears that they do not belong in their new and rich surroundings.

Soledad's fears turn out to be prescient, as her husband soon falls into the clutches of Mirta (Joan Page) a blonde with a heavy American accent.  In the end, however, Ramón realizes that he belongs with his loyal wife.

Critical view
Siempre Tuya presents the experience of Mexicans fleeing rural poverty and the difficult adaptation to city life.  On one level it is standard fare, with stock characters and a plot designed to showcase Negrete's singing.  It is in many ways typical of popular films of the Golden Age of Mexican cinema.  Ramón and Soledad's perseverance and loyalty are rewarded by a happy ending.

The plot also has a recurring subtext of Mexican pride and patriotism vis-a-vis the United States.  At the start of the film, García decides against going to the United States to look for work, saying that he belongs in his native land.  One of his short-lived jobs ends during a drinking session when he punches out his American boss for the American's racist mistreatment of a black employee.  He strikes a patriotic cord with the radio audience by singing traditional songs extolling Mexico.  In the end, as a final affirmation of his Mexican identity, he rejects the seduction of the beautiful and heartless American woman Mirta, to rejoin his wife.

Cast

 Jorge Negrete		
 Gloria Marín		
 Tito Junco		
 Arturo Soto Rangel		
 Juan M. Núñez		
 Abel López		
 Emilio Lara	
 Ismael Pérez		
 Ángel Infante		
 Lupe del Castillo		
 Fernando Galiana		
 Joaquín Grajales		
 Raúl Guerrero		
 Juan Muñoz	
 Joan Page

External links
 Cine Mexico

1952 films
1950s musical drama films
1950s Spanish-language films
Mexican black-and-white films
Mexican musical drama films
1952 drama films
1950s Mexican films